The Pseudoterpnini are a tribe of geometer moths in the subfamily Geometrinae. The tribe was described by Warren in 1893. It was alternatively treated as subtribe Pseudoterpniti by Jeremy Daniel Holloway in 1996.

Distribution
Pseudoterpnini are widely distributed in the Old World, from western Europe to the western Pacific, in temperate, subtropical and tropical regions.

Diversity
The tribe consists of over 300 species in 34 genera:

Absala Swinhoe, 1893
Actenochroma Warren, 1893
Aeolochroma Prout, 1912
Aplasta Hübner, [1823] 1816
Austroterpna Goldfinch, 1929
Calleremites Warren, 1894
Crypsiphona Meyrick, 1888
Cyneoterpna Prout, 1912 (=Autanepsia Turner, 1910)
Dindica Moore, 1888 (=Perissolophia Warren, 1893)
Dindicodes Prout, 1912
Epipristis Meyrick, 1888 (=Terpnidia Butler, 1892, Pingarmia Sterneck, 1927)
Heliomystis Meyrick, 1888
Herochroma Swinhoe, 1893 (=Chloroclydon Warren, 1894, Archaeobalbis Prout, 1912, Neobalbis Prout, 1912)
Holoterpna Püngeler, 1900
Hypobapta Prout, 1912 (=Hypochroma Guenée, [1858])
Hypodoxa Prout, 1912
Limbatochlamys Rothschild, 1894
Lophophelma Prout, 1912
Lophothorax Turner, 1939
Metallolophia Warren, 1895
Metaterpna Yazaki, 1992
Mictoschema Prout, 1922
Mimandria Warren, 1895
Orthorisma Prout, 1912 (=Orthocraspeda Prout, 1912)
Pachista Prout, 1912
Pachyodes Guenée, [1858] (=Archaeopseustes Warren, 1894)
Paraterpna Goldfinch, 1929
Pingasa Moore, [1887] (=Skorpisthes Lucas, 1900)
Protophyta Turner, 1910
Pseudoterpna Hübner, [1823]
Psilotagma Warren, 1894
Pullichroma Holloway, 1996
Rhuma Walker, 1860 (=Sterictopsis Warren, 1898, Oxyphanes Turner, 1936)
Sundadoxa Holloway, 1996

References

 Hausmann, A.; Sommerer, M.; Rougerie, R. & Hebert, P. (2009). "Hypobapta tachyhalotaria spec. nov. from Tasmania- an example of a new species revealed by DNA barcoding (Lepidoptera: Geometridae)". Spixiana. 32 (2): 161–166.
 Herbulot, C. (1999). "New Geometridae from Bioko Island, Equatorial Guinea (Lepidoptera, Geometridae)". Nouvelle Revue d'Entomologie. 16 (2): 147–153.
 Herbulot, C. (1999). "Nouveaux Géométrides de Madagascar (Lepidoptera: Geometridae)". Nouvelle Revue d'Entomologie. 16 (4): 303–309.
 

 
Geometrinae
Moth tribes